This is a survey of the postage stamps and postal history of the Maldives.

The Maldive Islands are located in the Indian Ocean and are formed by a double chain of twenty-six atolls stretching in a north-south direction off India's Lakshadweep islands, between Minicoy Island and Chagos Archipelago. They stand in the Laccadive Sea, about seven hundred kilometers south-west of Sri Lanka.

First stamps

The first stamps used in the islands were overprinted stamps of Ceylon issued on 9 September 1906. When those ran out, un-overprinted stamps of Ceylon were used.

The first stamps inscribed "Maldives" were issued on 15 May 1909.

Independence
On 26 July 1965, the sultanate gained independence from the United Kingdom.

In 1968, the Republic of Maldives was established.

References

Further reading 
Proud, Ted. The Postal History of B.I.O.T, Maldive Islands and Seychelles. Heathfield, Sussex: Proud Bailey Ltd.

External links
Maldives Post

Philately of the Maldives